Kalina is a feminine given name of Slavic origin meaning "Viburnum".

Notable bearers

Princess Kalina of Bulgaria
Kalina Jędrusik
Kalina Balabanova

See also

Slavic feminine given names
Bulgarian feminine given names
Macedonian feminine given names
Polish feminine given names